Dvořák – In Love? is a 1988 documentary film about the Czech composer Antonín Dvořák and a recording of his Cello Concerto by Julian Lloyd Webber and the Czech Philharmonic which was made in the same year. The film also tells of a love affair for the composer that never was, but was the inspiration for the concerto.

Originally a co-production with Czechoslovak Television, the finished film and its political content could not be shown in Communist-ruled Czechoslovakia. Two years later, after the fall of communism, the film was the first documentary to be shown on the newly-liberated Czechoslovak Television.

Credits

 Directed and edited by Tony Palmer
 The Dvořák Cello Concerto in B minor played by the Czech Philharmonic Orchestra conducted by Václav Neumann
 Julian Lloyd Webber, cello soloist
 The letters of Antonín Dvořák spoken by Vladek Sheybal

References

External links
 Interview with Julian Lloyd Webber
 Review
 Video clip

Documentary films about classical music and musicians
Films directed by Tony Palmer
1988 television films
1988 films